Tomorrow Come Today is the third studio album by Delaware band Boysetsfire, released in 2003.

"High Wire Escape Artist" appeared on the soundtrack to the 2003 movie Daredevil.

Critical reception
AllMusic wrote: "'Dying on Principle' and 'Handful of Redemption' might be the best songs on the album, encapsulating perfectly the band's rage, rhetoric, and conscious movement toward melody." Drowned in Sound wrote that "there are only so many times you can write the same song, and Boy Sets Fire don’t really seem to have progressed from their last album proper."

Track listing

References

Boysetsfire albums
2003 albums
Wind-up Records albums
Albums produced by Dave Fortman